Cinestate was a Dallas-based movie studio founded in 2016 by Dallas Sonnier. The company produced ten films under a variety of production labels, in addition to retroactively claiming the 2014 film Bone Tomahawk, produced independently by Sonnier, as a Cinestate movie. In 2017, the company acquired Fangoria magazine, relaunching it in 2018 as a print-only collectible under the editorial oversight of Phil Nobile Jr. In 2019, the company announced the launch of Rebeller Media, an action label that would have encompassed a production company and lifestyle website to be managed by Washington Free Beacon journalist Sonny Bunch. In 2020, following the arrest of producer Adam Donaghey for sexual assault and a Daily Beast article alleging misconduct on Cinestate sets, Rebeller was shut down and Fangoria sold, all Cinestate social media and websites went dormant, the company was closed and its entire staff laid off.

Two films produced by Cinestate under the "Fangoria Presents" and "Rebeller" labels, The Seventh Day and South of Heaven, respectively, were sold to distributors and released following the company's closure under the ad hoc label "Swiss Avenue Productions," named for the street where the company headquarters were once located.

A successor company, Bonfire Legend, was launched by Sonnier in early 2021 to carry on the company mission of the Rebeller Media label, in partnership with the Daily Wire.



History 
Dallas Sonnier moved from Dallas, TX to California, attending USC and graduating with dual degrees in business and film. He launched Caliber Media and started managing writer and aspiring director, S. Craig Zahler. After acquiring the script for Bone Tomahawk from Zahler, Sonnier premiered the film through Caliber Media. In 2016, Sonnier moved back to Dallas where he partnered with Will Evans, owner of Deep Vellum Publishing, to form Cinestate.

Filmography

Other ventures

Fangoria 
In 2018, Cinestate acquired Fangoria magazine from the Brooklyn Company for an undisclosed price, with plans to re-launch the publication as a quarterly edition and additionally develop Fangoria into a brand for producing movies, books and podcasts. As part of the deal, Cinestate controlled all material from over 300 issues of Fangoria magazine over 39 years.

Following the 2020 Daily Beast article about misconduct on Cinestate sets, the staff of Fangoria staged a walkout in protest, resulting in the brand being sold.

Books 
Cinestate released its first book, S. Craig Zahler's Hug Chickenpenny: The Panegyric of an Anomalous Child, alongside the announcement that Zahler would work with the Jim Henson Company to bring the title protagonist to life in an upcoming feature film. Additionally, Cinestate published The Megarothke, the debut novel from Robert Ashcroft. Its most recent novel released under the Cinestate label was Headcheese by Jess Hagemann. In 2020, a new Rebeller literary imprint was launched; a single title-- Natasha Tynes' They Called Me Wyatt-- was released shortly before the company shut down.

See also 
 A24
 Annapurna Pictures
 Neon

References

External links 

 Official Website

American film studios
2016 establishments in Texas